Contomastix celata is a species of teiid lizard endemic to Argentina.

References

celata
Reptiles of Argentina
Endemic fauna of Argentina
Reptiles described in 2019
Taxa named by Mario R. Cabrera
Taxa named by Santiago Carreira
Taxa named by Diego O. Di Pietro
Taxa named by Paula C. Rivera